Events in the year 1660 in Japan.

Incumbents
Monarch: Go-Sai

Events
January 25 - The first bridge to span the Sumida River in Tokyo, the Ryōgoku Bridge, is built to give people a means of escape from fires. (Traditional Japanese Date: Thirteenth Day of the Twelfth Month, 1659)

References

 
1660s in Japan
Japan
Years of the 17th century in Japan